Bucher Ayres Farm is a historic home and farm complex located at Ferguson Township, Centre County, Pennsylvania, United States.  The complex consists of the main house, a carriage shed / ice house, a smoke house, and an outhouse.  The main house was built in 1858, and is in three sections.  The main block is two stories and five bays wide in a traditional Georgian style.  It features a three bay, Greek Revival style portico with a hipped roof.

It was added to the National Register of Historic Places in 1980.

References

Farms on the National Register of Historic Places in Pennsylvania
Georgian architecture in Pennsylvania
Houses completed in 1858
Houses in Centre County, Pennsylvania
National Register of Historic Places in Centre County, Pennsylvania